Phanes Press is a New Age book publishing imprint of Red Wheel Weiser Conari.

Phanes Press was founded by David Fideler in 1985 to publish Neoplatonic and other esoteric texts. One of its representative and more significant publications was The Pythagorean Sourcebook translated by Kenneth Sylvan Guthrie issued in 1987. The company had published 52 titles by 2004, when it was purchased by Red Wheel/Weiser.

References

Publishing companies established in 1985
Book publishing company imprints
New Age organizations
1985 establishments in Massachusetts